Patrick Verschueren (born 12 September 1962) is a Belgian former racing cyclist. He rode in four editions of the Tour de France.

References

External links

1962 births
Living people
Belgian male cyclists
Sportspeople from Mechelen
Cyclists from Antwerp Province